In mathematics, the Fermat curve is the algebraic curve in the complex projective plane defined in homogeneous coordinates (X:Y:Z) by the Fermat equation

Therefore, in terms of the affine plane its equation is

An integer solution to the Fermat equation would correspond to a nonzero rational number solution to the affine equation, and vice versa. But by Fermat's Last Theorem it is now known that (for n > 2) there are no nontrivial integer solutions to the Fermat equation; therefore, the Fermat curve has no nontrivial rational points.

The Fermat curve is non-singular and has genus

This means genus 0 for the case n = 2 (a conic) and genus 1 only for n = 3 (an elliptic curve). The Jacobian variety of the Fermat curve has been studied in depth.  It is isogenous to a product of simple abelian varieties with complex multiplication.

The Fermat curve also has gonality

Fermat varieties
Fermat-style equations in more variables define as projective varieties the Fermat varieties.

Related studies

Algebraic curves
Diophantine geometry